The sunrise problem can be expressed as follows: "What is the probability that the sun will rise tomorrow?" The sunrise problem illustrates the difficulty of using probability theory when evaluating the plausibility of statements or beliefs.

According to the Bayesian interpretation of probability, probability theory can be used to evaluate the plausibility of the statement, "The sun will rise tomorrow."

Laplace's approach 

The sunrise problem was first introduced in the 18th century by Pierre-Simon Laplace, who treated it by means of his rule of succession.  Let p be the long-run frequency of sunrises, i.e., the sun rises on 100 × p% of days.  Prior to knowing of any sunrises, one is completely ignorant of the value of p.  Laplace represented this prior ignorance by means of a uniform probability distribution on p.  For instance, the probability that p is between 20% and 50% is just 30%.  This must not be interpreted to mean that in 30% of all cases, p is between 20% and 50%.  Rather, it means that one's state of knowledge (or ignorance) justifies one in being 30% sure that the sun rises between 20% of the time and 50% of the time.  Given the value of p, and no other information relevant to the question of whether the sun will rise tomorrow, the probability that the sun will rise tomorrow is p.  But we are not "given the value of p".  What we are given is the observed data: the sun has risen every day on record.  Laplace inferred the number of days by saying that the universe was created about 6000 years ago, based on a  young-earth creationist  reading of the Bible. To find the conditional probability distribution of p given the data, one uses Bayes' theorem, which some call the Bayes–Laplace rule.  Having found the conditional probability distribution of p given the data, one may then calculate the conditional probability, given the data, that the sun will rise tomorrow.  That conditional probability is given by the rule of succession.  The plausibility that the sun will rise tomorrow increases with the number of days on which the sun has risen so far.  Specifically, assuming p has an a-priori distribution that is uniform over the interval [0,1], and that, given the value of p, the sun independently rises each day with probability p, the desired conditional probability is:  

 

Expressed as a percentage, this is approximately a  chance.

However, Laplace recognized this to be a misapplication of the rule of succession through not taking into account all the prior information available immediately after deriving the result:

Jaynes & Bretthorst note that Laplace's warning had gone unheeded by workers in the field.

A reference class problem arises: the plausibility inferred will depend on whether we take the past experience of one person, of humanity, or of the earth.  A consequence is that each referent would hold different plausibility of the statement. In Bayesianism, any probability is a conditional probability given what one knows.  That varies from one person to another.

See also 
 Doomsday argument: a similar problem that raises intense philosophical debate
 Newcomb's paradox
 Problem of induction
 Unsolved problems in statistics
 Additive smoothing (also called Laplace smoothing)

References

Further reading

Howie, David. (2002). Interpreting probability: controversies and developments in the early twentieth century. Cambridge University Press. pp. 24. 

Probability problems
Statistical inference
Bayesian statistics